This is a list of Chattanooga Mocs football players in the NFL Draft. The Mocs play for University of Tennessee at Chattanooga.

Key

Selections

References

Chattanooga

Chattanooga Mocs NFL Draft